Europos or Europus can refer to :

 Europus, a son of the mythological Makedon and Oreithyia

Places and jurisdictions 
 in Asia 
 Dura-Europos alias Cirablus, an Ancient city and former bishopric in modern-day Syria, now a Latin Catholic titular see
 Dura-Europos synagogue, a synagogue in the above city
 Europus, the ancient name of Carchemish in northern modern-day Syria
 Europus, the ancient name of Euromus in ancient Caria, modern-day Turkey
 A less known temporary name of Rey, Iran: the successors of Alexander rebuilt the town "Rhages" and renamed it "Europos" 

 in Europe
 Europus (Almopia), a town of Almopia, in ancient Macedonia
 Europus (Macedonia), a town in ancient Macedonia, near the site of the modern town below
 Evropos municipality in modern Macedonia

See also 
 Europa (disambiguation)
 Europe (disambiguation)